Acalolepta truncata is a species of beetle in the family Cerambycidae. It was described by Stephan von Breuning in 1938. It is known from Papua New Guinea.

References

Acalolepta
Beetles described in 1938